The prime minister of Luxembourg is the head of government of Luxembourg. The prime minister leads the executive branch, chairs the Cabinet and appoints its ministers.

Since 1989, the title of Prime Minister has been an official one, although the head of the government had been unofficially known by that name for some time. Between 1857 and 1989, the prime minister was styled the President of the Government, with the exception of the 25-day premiership of Mathias Mongenast. Before 1857, the prime minister was the President of the Council. In addition to these titles, the prime minister uses the title Minister of State, although this is usually relegated to a secondary title.

This is a list of prime ministers and governments since the post was founded, in 1848. In larger font are the dates of the prime ministers entering and leaving office. The smaller dates, during the respective premierships, are those of the prime ministers' governments. Luxembourg has a collegial governmental system; often, the government will present its resignation, only for the successor government to include many, if not most, of the previous ministers serving under the same prime minister. Each of the smaller dates reflects a change in the government without a change of prime minister.

Era of independents (1848–1918)
From the promulgation of the first constitution, in 1848, until the early twentieth century, Luxembourgish politics was dominated by independent politicians and statesmen. The prerogative powers of the grand duke remained undiluted, and, as such, the monarch actively chose and personally appointed the prime minister. As a result, the prime minister was often a moderate, without any strong affiliation to either of the two major ideological factions in the Chamber of Deputies: the secularist liberals and the Catholic conservatives.

In the early twentieth century, the emergence of socialism as a third force in Luxembourgish politics ended the dominance of independents, and further politicised the government of the country. This did not affect the prime minister's position until 1915, when the long-serving Paul Eyschen died in office. His death created a struggle for power between the main factions, leading to the establishment of the formalised party system.

Prime ministers from 1848 to 1890

The Kingdom of the Netherlands shared the same monarchs with the Grand Duchy of Luxembourg from 1815 to 1890. The Grand Duchy has had its own monarchs since 1890.

Prime ministers from 1890 to 1918

Party system (1918–present)
In 1918, towards the end of World War I, a new Chamber of Deputies was elected with the explicit ambition of reviewing the constitution. To this end, formalised parties were formed by the main political blocs, so as to increase their bargaining power in the negotiations. The revisions to the constitution introduced universal suffrage and compulsory voting, adopted proportional representation, and limited the sovereignty of the monarch.

Since the foundation of the party system, only one cabinet (between 1921 and 1925) has not included members of more than one party. Most of the time, governments are grand coalitions of the two largest parties, no matter their ideology; this has made Luxembourg one of the most stable democracies in the world. Two cabinets (between 1945 and 1947) included members of every party represented in the Chamber of Deputies.

During the occupation of Luxembourg by Nazi Germany in World War II, Luxembourg was governed by a Nazi Party official, Gustav Simon. Pierre Dupong continued to lead the government in exile in the United Kingdom until the liberation of Luxembourg in December 1944, whereupon the constitutional Luxembourg government returned to the Grand Duchy. Thus, although Luxembourg was formally annexed on 30 August 1942, the prime minister of the government in exile, Pierre Dupong, is assumed to have remained prime minister throughout.

Prime ministers since 1918
Political Party:

See also
 List of monarchs of Luxembourg
 Lists of office-holders
 List of presidents of the Council of State of Luxembourg

References
Specific

Bibliography

External links
 Website of the Prime Minister of Luxembourg

 Website of the Luxembourg Government

Prime Ministers
 
Luxembourg
Luxembourg
1848 establishments in Luxembourg